Döllnfließ is a small river of Brandenburg, Germany. It flows into the Voßkanal, a canalized section of the Havel, near Liebenwalde.

See also
List of rivers of Brandenburg

External links
 Official geographic portal Brandenburg-Viewer: Topographic map 1:10,000 showing the source of the Döllnfließ

Rivers of Brandenburg
Rivers of Germany